Cozza Frenzy is the fifth full-length album by American electronic dance music artist Bassnectar, released on September 29, 2009 from Om Records after 3 years of production. The album of 15 songs contains collaborations with artists including Fever Ray, Zumbi of Zion I, Mr. Projectile, and Capital J.

Track listing

Charts

References 

https://itunes.apple.com/us/album/cozza-frenzy/id330205026
http://www.jambase.com/Articles/19601/Bassnectar-Cozza-Frenzy-Album-and-Support-Tour

2009 albums
Bassnectar albums